Ein Schnupfen hätte auch gereicht is a 2017 German television film directed by Christine Hartmann about the life of actress and comedian Gaby Köster played by Anna Schudt.

Cast 
Anna Schudt ... Gaby Köster
Stephan Grossmann ... Adrian Schmitt
Jasmin Schwiers ... Jackie
Moritz Bäckerling ... Donald
Ludwig Hansmann ... Severin
Aslan Aslan ... Jesus / Michael
Hella von Sinnen ... Hella von Sinnen
Hugo Egon Balder ... Hugo Egon Balder
Clemens Giebel ... Aufnahmeleiter
Mike Krüger ... Mike Krüger

Accolades 
Anna Schudt received a nomination for best actress at the German Television Award 2018 for her role in Ein Schnupfen. She won the 2018 International Emmy Award as best actress.

References

External links

2017 television films
2017 films
2017 drama films
German drama television films
Films based on books
2010s German-language films
German-language television shows
2010s German films
RTL (German TV channel) original programming